Yuan Ye (born 1 July 1979) is a Chinese short track speed skater.

He who won a bronze medal in the 5000 m relay at the 1998 Winter Olympics, together with teammates Li Jiajun, Feng Kai and An Yulong.

References

External links
Database Olympics
Yuan Ye at ISU
Yuan Ye at the-sports.org

1979 births
Living people
Chinese male speed skaters
Short track speed skaters at the 1998 Winter Olympics
Olympic short track speed skaters of China
Olympic bronze medalists for China
Olympic medalists in short track speed skating
Medalists at the 1998 Winter Olympics
Chinese male short track speed skaters
Asian Games medalists in short track speed skating
Short track speed skaters at the 1999 Asian Winter Games
Medalists at the 1999 Asian Winter Games
Asian Games gold medalists for China
Asian Games bronze medalists for China
Speed skaters from Changchun
20th-century Chinese people